Histamine trifluoromethyl toluidide (HTFMT) is a mixed H1/H2 histamine agonist which is significantly more potent than histamine itself. 

It also produces additional actions which appear to be independent of histamine receptors.

References 

Histamine agonists
Imidazoles
Trifluoromethyl compounds